Lei Kung the Thunderer is a fictional character appearing in American comic books published by Marvel Comics. His notable pupils include Iron Fist and his son Steel Serpent.

Lei Kung was portrayed by Hoon Lee in the Marvel Cinematic Universe (MCU) Netflix television series Iron Fist.

Publication history

The character first appeared in Marvel Premiere #16 (July 1974).

Fictional character biography
Yu-Ti apprenticed the young Daniel Rand to Lei Kung the Thunderer, who teaches him the martial arts while in the mystical city of K'un-L'un. The Steel Serpent (the exiled son of Lei Kung) later becomes one of the adversaries of the Iron Fist as he coveted the Iron Fist power.

After she was busted for training three cavemen, Fan Fei was chained up and watched as the cavemen were fed to Shou-Lou by Lei Kung. When Fan Fei defeated Shou-Lao, Lei Kung had Fan Fei exiled from K'un-Lun. Sometime later, Lei Kung was at the entrance of K'un-Lun when Fan Fei came across it. Lei Kung states that her sentencing was wrong and wanted to bring her home. Fan Fei declined stating that Earth was her home and her fights here are just the beginning.

When Steel Serpent failed to defeat Shou-Lao, Lei Kung found him weeping in the snow. He then took Steel Serpent back to the city.

During the Avengers vs. X-Men storyline, Iron Fist brings Lei Kung to take Hope to K'un-L'un for training. As the Phoenix Force-powered Namor attacked Wakanda, Iron Man told Lei Kung to pull Hope Summers back to K'un-L'un and seal the portal before Namor gets through. The Avengers later arrived in K'un-L'un. When the Phoenix Force-powered Cyclops attacked K'un-L'un, Lei Kung met with Hope Summers outside the Cave of Shou-Lao telling her that it's time for her final lesson. They rode Shou-Lao into battle where they were blasted out of the air by the Phoenix Force-powered Cyclops. Tapping into Shou-Lao's powers, Hope Summers used a special punch to send Cyclops back to Earth where the punch also temporarily incapacitated him. As K'un-L'un was being rebuilt following the resulting battle, Lei Kung held a small boy on his shoulders as he tells Iron Man that they don't need help in the reconstruction of the city. He did counsel Iron Man telling him that magic and science are not as divided as he thinks. Iron Man then leaves at Lei Kung's suggestion to handle the damage in his area.

Powers and abilities
The weapons master of K'un-Lun, Lei Kung is a martial arts expert, one of the finest in the Marvel universe.

In other media
Lei Kung appears in the Netflix web series Iron Fist, portrayed by Hoon Lee. The parts with him being Steel Serpent's father and Daniel Rand's mentor are intact in this series. Lei Kung first appears in the episode "Immortal Emerges from Cave" where he appears to Danny Rand in a vision during meditation recapping a K'un-L'un story. As Danny Rand does his fights with Andrei and Grigori Veznikov, Bride of Nine Spiders, and Scythe, Lei Kung dispenses some wisdom which Danny uses in his fights against them. When Lei Kung's vision tells him to finish off Scythe, Madame Gao appeared to threaten to use her knife on Radovan Bernivig's captive daughter Sabina causing Danny Rand to cease finishing off Scythe. Though Lei Kung in Danny Rand's vision was disappointed in this, Danny Rand told him on the way out that Madame Gao cheated and that he had no other choice. Lei Kung's vision remain silent as Danny left with Sabina. In the episode "Black Tiger Steel Hearts," Davos tells Danny Rand that he was sent by Lei Kung to retrieve Danny while also mentioning that his father is concerned and angry with him. In the episode "Lead Horse Back to Stable," it was mentioned in a humorous discussion between Danny and Davos that they once rode a chariot around the lake to see any bathing women from the village only to stumble upon Lei Kung meditating in the nude. He briefly reappears in the second season where in flashback, he and his fellow Order of the Crane Mother members Yü-Ti and Priya watch Danny Rand and Davos fight for the right to face Shou-Lao. When Danny turns the tide against Davos and tries to get him to yield, Lei Kung ends the fight declaring that Danny will face Shou-Lao.

References

External links
 Lei Kung at Marvel Wiki
 Lei Kung at Comic Vine
 Lei Kung at Marvel Appendix

Iron Fist (comics)
Marvel Comics martial artists
Marvel Comics superheroes